Purano Jhangajholi  is a village development committee in Sindhuli District in the Janakpur Zone of south-eastern Nepal. At the time of the 1991 Nepal census, it had a population of 4,474 people living in 816 individual households. The village is notable for a highway reportedly among Asia's most dangerous; small mirrors cover its retaining wall to draw on Seti Devi Mata, a deity, to prevent accidents.

References

External links
UN map of the municipalities of Sindhuli District

Populated places in Sindhuli District